The Counterfeit Detective is a 2016 mystery pastiche novel written by Stuart Douglas, featuring Sherlock Holmes and Dr. John Watson up against an impostor.

Titan Books published the book in October 2016, as part of its Further Adventures series, which collects a number of noted Holmesian pastiches.

Plot 
Holmes and Watson sail to New York to investigate another Sherlock Holmes, whose powers and results are comparable to the original. However, in trying to get answers, their target has vanished and his clients are far from obliging...

Reception 
Publishers Weekly were positive, saying 'Watson is an active partner to his friend, and the plot twists will surprise many readers. Fans of traditional pastiches will hope that Douglas writes more of them.'

See also 
 Sherlock Holmes pastiches

References

External links 
The Counterfeit Detective at Titan Books

Sherlock Holmes pastiches
Sherlock Holmes novels